Claudine Röhnisch was a German nurse. She was awarded the Florence Nightingale Medal in 1963.

Life 
In 1918 she worked as a student nurse at the Charité hospital in Berlin. In 1929, she qualified as a senior nurse. In 1933, she was dismissed. In 1945, she took part in the re-opening of the Charité.

References

Sources 

 
 
 

Florence Nightingale Medal recipients
German nurses
German women nurses